Skydivers is a 1984 Soviet drama film directed by Yuri Ivanchuk.

Plot 
Girl Zina met with aerial filmmaker Sergei Aleikin, as a result of which she became interested in parachuting and decided to take part in international competitions, in which she became a contender for a gold medal. And suddenly a tragedy occurred: the helicopter in which Sergey was in fell into the gorge, and this forces Zina to leave the sport.

Cast 
 Aleksandra Yakovleva as Zinaida Gostilova
 Boris Nevzorov as Sergey Aleikin
 Yelena Yelanskaya as Olga Filatova
 Vladlen Biryukov as Nikolay Lykov
 Stepan Starchikov as Aleksey Volchik
 Valeri Ryzhakov as Matvey Gostilov
 Vadim Zakharchenko as Vladimir Mikeshin
 Ivars Kalnins
 Elena Astafeva as Masha Zaikina
 Natalya Kaznacheeva as Galina Nechaeva

References

External links 
 

1984 films
1980s Russian-language films
Soviet drama films
1984 drama films
Skydivers